The following highways are numbered 267:

Canada
Manitoba Provincial Road 267
Prince Edward Island Route 267
 Quebec Route 267

Ireland
 R267 regional road

Japan
 Japan National Route 267

United States
 Alabama State Route 267
 Arkansas Highway 267
 Arkansas Highway 267 Spur
 California State Route 267
 Florida State Road 267 
 Georgia State Route 267 (former)
 Illinois Route 267
 Indiana State Road 267
 K-267 (Kansas highway)
Kentucky Route 267
 Maryland Route 267
 Minnesota State Highway 267
 Missouri Route 267
 Nevada State Route 267
 New Mexico State Road 267
 New York State Route 267 (former)
 Ohio State Route 267
 Pennsylvania Route 267
 South Carolina Highway 267
 Tennessee State Route 267
 Texas State Highway 267 (former)
 Farm to Market Road 267 (Texas)
 Utah State Route 267 (former)
 Virginia State Route 267